The third season of Prison Break, an American serial drama television series, commenced airing in the United States on September 17, 2007, on Mondays at 8:00 pm (EST) on Fox. Prison Break is produced by Adelstein-Parouse Productions, in association with Rat Entertainment, Original Film and 20th Century Fox Television. The season contains 13 episodes, and concluded on February 18, 2008. The season was shorter than the previous two due to the Writer's Guild strike.

Prison Break revolves around two brothers: one who has been sentenced to death for a crime he did not commit and his younger sibling, a genius structural engineer, who devises an elaborate plan to help him escape prison. The two brothers escape prison in the first season, but are hunted down during the second season and ultimately Michael is recaptured and sent to a Panamanian jail, Penitenciaría Federal de Sona, at the end of the second season. The third season revolves around Michael's breakout from Sona with several other inmates.

For the season, three characters are removed, and four new characters are added as series regulars. Filming continued to take place in Dallas, Texas.

Cast

Main characters
Dominic Purcell as Lincoln Burrows
Wentworth Miller as Michael Scofield
Amaury Nolasco as Fernando Sucre
Wade Williams as Brad Bellick
Robert Knepper as Theodore "T-Bag" Bagwell
Chris Vance as James Whistler
Robert Wisdom as Norman "Lechero" St. John
Danay Garcia as Sofia Lugo
Jodi Lyn O'Keefe as Gretchen Morgan
William Fichtner as Alexander Mahone

Recurring characters

Episodes

Reception
In their season review, IGN wrote, "With so much going against it, this shortened third season of Prison Break could have been disastrous. But instead, the writers managed to not only salvage the season, but tell a tightly woven, compelling and action-packed story" and gave it an 8.5 out of 10.

Production

Filming

Unlike many other TV shows, Prison Break was primarily filmed outside of Hollywood. The first season was primarily shot in and around Chicago, Illinois. During the second season, filming was moved to Dallas, Texas. Filming for the third season continued to be done in Dallas, but the price tag increased to about $3 million per episode. Several of the exterior scenes with Lincoln and Gretchen negotiating the escape from the Panama jail were shot in the Casco Viejo quarter of Panama City.

Home media release

References

External links
 

Prison Break
Prison Break episodes
2007 American television seasons
2008 American television seasons
Television shows set in Panama